Durham Centre or Durham Center may refer to:

Durham Centre (Durham, North Carolina), a skyscraper
Durham Centre (provincial electoral district), a defunct Canadian electoral district
Durham Education Center, an alternative school in Tigard, Oregon
Main Street Historic District (Durham, Connecticut), also known as Durham Center